Pierre Excoffier is a French audio engineer.

He won the César Award for Best Sound in 2010. He is also a teacher at La Fémis.

Filmography 
 1994: Léon: The Professional
 2002: Aram by Robert Kechichian
 2002: Asterix & Obelix: Mission Cleopatra
 2004: RRRrrrr!!!
 2006: Cabaret Paradis
 2009: Le Concert

Nominations and distinctions 
 Nominated for the César Award for Best Sound for Léon: The Professional by Luc Besson
 César Award for Best Sound for Le Concert at the 35th César Awards

References

External links 
 
 Pierre Excoffier

French audio engineers
20th-century births
Living people
Year of birth missing (living people)